Cicada barbara subsp. lusitanica is a subspecies of Cicada barbara belonging to the family Cicadidae, subfamily Cicadinae and the genus Cicada.

Distribution 
Present in Portugal.

References 

Cicadini
Hemiptera of Europe
Insects described in 1982
Subspecies